In mathematics, a superelliptic curve is an algebraic curve defined by an equation of the form

where  is an integer and f is a polynomial of degree  with coefficients in a field ; more precisely, it is the smooth projective curve whose function field defined by this equation.

The Diophantine problem of finding integer points on a superelliptic curve can be solved by a method similar to one used for the resolution of hyperelliptic equations: a Siegel identity is used to reduce to a Thue equation.

Definition 
More generally, a superelliptic curve is a cyclic branched covering

of the projective line of degree  coprime to the characteristic of the field of definition. The degree  of the covering map is also referred to as the degree of the curve. By cyclic covering we mean that the Galois group of the covering (i.e., the corresponding function field extension) is cyclic.

The fundamental theorem of Kummer theory implies  that a superelliptic curve of degree  defined over a field  has an affine model given by an equation

For example, this is always the case when  is algebraically closed. In particular, function field extension  is a Kummer extension.

Ramification
Define set

As before, we assume that . Then

For the point at infinity, define integer  as follows. If 

then . Note that . Then analogously to the other ramification points,

In particular, the curve is unramified over infinity if and only if its degree  divides .

Genus

By the Riemann-Hurwitz formula, the genus of a superelliptic curve is given by

See also
 Hyperelliptic curve
 Branched covering
 Artin-Schreier curve
 Kummer theory
 Superellipse

References

 
 
 
  
 

Algebraic curves